Oenanthe globulosa is a species of perennial herb in the family Apiaceae. They have a self-supporting growth form and simple, broad leaves.

Sources

References 

Apioideae